The First English Civil War took place in England and Wales from 1642 to 1646. It is part of the 1639 to 1653 Wars of the Three Kingdoms, which also include the Bishops' Wars, the Irish Confederate Wars, the Second English Civil War, the Anglo-Scottish war (1650–1652) and the Cromwellian conquest of Ireland. Historians calculate some 15% to 20% of all adult males in England and Wales served in the military between 1639 to 1653, while around 4% of the total population died from war-related causes, versus 2.23% for World War I. These figures illustrate the impact of the conflict on society in general, and the bitterness it engendered.

Conflict over the role of Parliament and religious practice dated from the accession of James VI and I in 1603. These tensions culminated in the imposition of Personal Rule in 1629 by his son, Charles I, who recalled Parliament in April and November 1640. He did so hoping to obtain funding that would enable him to reverse his defeat by Scots Covenanters in the Bishops' Wars, but in return they demanded a greater share in government than he was willing to concede. 

In its early stages, the vast majority on both sides supported the institution of monarchy, but disagreed on who held ultimate authority. Royalists generally argued both Parliament and the Church of England were subordinate to the king, while most of their Parliamentarian opponents claimed his supremacy did not extend to religion, and wanted a form of constitutional monarchy. When it came to choosing sides, however, individual choices were heavily influenced by religious belief or personal loyalty. Horrified at the devastation inflicted on Europe by the Thirty Years War, many tried to remain neutral, or took up arms with great reluctance.

When fighting began in August 1642, both sides believed it would be settled by a single battle, but it soon became clear this was not the case. Royalist successes in 1643 led to an alliance between Parliament and the Scots who won a series of battles in 1644, the most significant being the Battle of Marston Moor. Alleged failures to exploit these successes led Parliament in February 1645 to set up the New Model Army, the first centrally-funded and professional military force in England, whose success at Naseby in June 1645 proved decisive. The war ended with victory for the Parliamentarian alliance in June 1646 and Charles in custody, but his refusal to negotiate concessions and divisions among his opponents led to the Second English Civil War in 1648.

Overview

The 1642 to 1646 First English Civil War is one in a series of connected civil wars between 1639 and 1653, fought in England and Wales, along with the separate kingdoms of Scotland and Ireland. It was the culmination of a long-running struggle for political and religious control between the monarchy and Parliament that began in 1603 when James VI and I became king, and continued after the 1660 Stuart Restoration. Many of the issues involved were only resolved with the 1688 Glorious Revolution, and arguably continued beyond that point. American historians like Kevin Phillips have identified many similarities between those at stake in 1642 and the American Revolution in 1776.

Known collectively as the 1639 to 1653 Wars of the Three Kingdoms, other conflicts include the 1641 to 1653 Irish Confederate Wars, the 1639 to 1640 Bishops' Wars, and the 1649 to 1653 Cromwellian conquest of Ireland. Separately, the First and Second English Civil Wars are grouped together into the 1642 to 1649 English Civil War. What was previously known as the 1650 to 1652 Third English Civil War is now more commonly referred to as the Anglo-Scottish war, since it was fought between Scots and English armies and not accompanied by an uprising in England.

Royalist versus Parliamentarian
Splitting the parties into Cavaliers, 'wrong, but romantic', and Roundheads, 'right, but repulsive', is a perspective largely promulgated by the Victorians, and while long accepted as outdated, this view still informs modern perceptions. One reason is the complex personal nature and historical reputation of Oliver Cromwell, particularly in Ireland. The installation of his statue outside the Houses of Parliament was approved in 1856, but not carried out until 1895, with most of the funds supplied by Lord Rosebery, then Prime Minister. In 2004, a group of MPs unsuccessfully proposed a motion to have it melted down, and the debate continues.    

In reality, individual motives for choosing a side were complex and there were considerable areas of overlap, particularly in the early stages. Historian Tim Harris suggests that by 1640 there was general agreement attempts by Charles to govern without Parliament had gone too far. This changed after the Grand Remonstrance was submitted in late 1641, when moderates like Edward Hyde switched sides, arguing Parliament was trying to alter the balance too much the other way. 

Both sides claimed they were seeking to restore the "ancient constitution"; for many Parliamentarians, Stuart concepts of Divine right of kings and absolutism brought in by James VI and I in 1603 were "innovations" that had undermined traditional English political and legal principles. This helps explain the internal tensions that developed within Parliament as the war progressed, since not everyone agreed on what they were seeking to restore or even if it were desirable. 

Most Parliamentarians went to war in 1642 to regulate the king's powers, rather than depose him; John Pym, their leader in the Commons, was one of the few to recognise it might be the only option, since past experience showed Charles would not keep commitments he considered forced on him. Examples included his annulment of the 1628 Petition of Right, and the recent Bishops Wars, when he agreed peace terms with the Scots in 1639 only to provide time for another attempt in 1640. These doubts were confirmed when he and his wife Henrietta Maria repeatedly told foreign ambassadors any concessions made to Parliament were temporary, and would be retrieved by force.

The personality and credibility of the king mattered, because regardless of religion or political belief, the vast majority in all three kingdoms believed a 'well-ordered' monarchy was divinely mandated. His opponents argued that if Charles would not obey his own laws or keep his promises, his refusal presented a threat to the state which required military intervention to either force him to do so, or depose him in favour of his eldest son. Where they disagreed was what 'well-ordered' meant and who held ultimate authority, especially in clerical affairs; this mattered, because in the 17th century 'true religion' and 'good government' were assumed to be the same. In general, Royalists supported a Church of England governed by bishops, appointed by, and answerable to, the king, while most Parliamentarians believed he was answerable to the leaders of the church, appointed by their congregations. 

A common misperception is that "Roundhead" was interchangeable with "Puritan". In reality, this term applied to anyone who wanted to "purify" the Church of England of "Papist" practices, and covered a wide range of views. Although the majority supported Parliament, some prominent Puritans like Sir William Savile backed Charles out of personal loyalty. Conversely, many Royalists objected to Laudianism, and opposed the appointment of Catholics to senior positions, while attempts to integrate Irish Catholic troops in 1643 caused some regiments to mutiny. Parliamentarians were divided between Presbyterians like Pym who wanted to reform the Church of England, and religious Independents who rejected any form of established church and wanted it abolished. They included Congregationalists like Cromwell and Baptists, who were especially well represented in the New Model Army. 

 

Later in the war, conflicting religious and political aims resulted in the emergence within Parliament of a middle party of "Independent Royalists", who were generally religious radicals but social conservatives. Led by William Fiennes, 1st Viscount Saye and Sele, his son Nathaniel Fiennes, and Nathaniel Rich, they were distinguished from Royalists in believing Charles had to be defeated militarily, and from moderate Presbyterians by their fervent opposition to state-mandated religion. After Parliament's victory in 1646, this group supported the Treaty of Newport and a "balanced" political solution that would leave Charles on the throne. Its members avoided participation in his trial and execution, although they did not speak against it.            

While Puritans were the most visible in opposing Laudian reforms and demanding the removal of bishops from the Church of England, their objections were shared by many Royalists, such as George Morley and Sir Edmund Verney. One reason was that bishops held a variety of non-religious roles which impacted all levels of society; they acted as state censors, who were able to ban sermons and writings, while ordinary people could be tried by church courts for crimes including blasphemy, heresy, fornication and other 'sins of the flesh', as well as matrimonial or inheritance disputes. As members of the House of Lords, bishops often blocked legislation opposed by the Crown; their ousting from Parliament by the Clergy Act 1640 was a major step on the road to war, since it meant Charles could no longer prevent passage of legislation that he opposed. 

Their removal also ended censorship and led to an explosion in the printing of pamphlets, books and sermons, many advocating radical religious and political principles, especially in London. Even before 1642, such radicalism concerned Parliamentarians like Denzil Holles who believed in a limited electorate and a Presbyterian church similar to the Church of Scotland. Both they and their Scottish allies came to see the Independents as more dangerous than the Royalists and formed the "Peace Party", seeking a negotiated end to the war; an alliance between these groups led to the Second English Civil War in 1648. Lastly, England in 1642 was a structured, socially conservative and peaceful society, while the example of the Thirty Years War meant many wanted to avoid conflict at any cost. Choice of sides was often driven by personal relationships or loyalties, and in the early stages there were numerous examples of armed neutrality, or local truces, designed to force the two sides to negotiate.

1642

Over the winter of 1641 to 1642, many towns strengthened their defences, and purchased weapons, although not necessarily due to fears of civil war. Lurid details of the Irish Rebellion of 1641 meant many were more concerned by reports of a planned Catholic invasion. Both sides supported raising troops to suppress the rising, but alleged Royalist conspiracies to use them against Parliament meant neither trusted the other with their control. When Charles left London after failing to arrest the Five Members in January 1642, he handed Parliament control of the largest city, port and commercial centre in England, its biggest weapons store in the Tower of London, and best equipped local militia, or Trained bands.

Founded in 1572, these were organised by county, controlled by Lord-lieutenants appointed by the king, and constituted the only permanent military force in the country. The muster roll of February 1638 shows wide variations in size, equipment and training; Yorkshire had the largest, with 12,000 men, followed by London with 8,000, later increased to 20,000. 'Royalist' counties like Shropshire or Glamorgan had fewer than 500 men.

In March 1642, Parliament approved the Militia Ordinance, claiming control of the trained bands; Charles responded with his own Commissions of Array. More important than the men were the local arsenals, with Parliament holding the two largest in London, and Hull. These belonged to the local community, who often resisted attempts to remove them, by either side. In Royalist Cheshire, the towns of Nantwich, Knutsford and Chester declared a state of armed neutrality, and excluded both parties.

Ports were vital for access to internal and external waterways, the primary method of importing and transporting bulk supplies until the advent of railways in the 19th century. Most of the Royal Navy declared for Parliament, allowing them to protect the trade routes vital to the London merchant community, block Royalist imports and resupply isolated Parliamentarian garrisons. It also made other countries wary of antagonising one of the strongest navies in Europe by providing support to their opponents. By September, forces loyal to Parliament held every major port in England apart from Newcastle, which prevented Royalist areas in Wales, South-West and North East England from supporting each other. In February 1642, Charles sent his wife, Henrietta Maria, to the Hague to raise money and purchase weapons; lack of a secure port delayed her return until February 1643, and even then, she narrowly escaped capture.

On 1 June 1642, Parliament approved a list of proposals known as the Nineteen Propositions, which would give them control over ministerial appointments, the army and management of the Royal household, including the education and marriage of his children. These were presented to Charles at Newmarket, who angrily rejected them without further discussion. He was later persuaded to issue a more conciliatory answer, whose objective was primarily to appeal to moderates by placing blame for what now seemed an inevitable military conflict on Pym and his followers. Drafted by Hyde, this response has been seen as the origin of "mixed" or Constitutional monarchy, although whether Charles himself genuinely believed in it is debatable.

Both sides expected a single battle and quick victory; for the Royalists, this meant capturing London, for Parliament, 'rescuing' the king from his 'evil counsellors.' After failing to capture Hull in July, Charles left York for Nottingham, chosen for its proximity to Royalist areas in the Midlands and Northern Wales. Particularly in the early stages of the conflict, locally raised troops were reluctant to serve outside their own county, and most of those recruited in Yorkshire refused to accompany him. On 22 August, Charles formally declared war on Parliamentarian 'rebels', but by early September his army still numbered less than 2,500, with much of England hoping to remain neutral. 

In contrast, financing from the London mercantile community and weapons from the Tower enabled Parliament to recruit and equip an army of 20,000, commanded by the Presbyterian Earl of Essex, who left London on 3 September for Northampton. Charles relocated to Shrewsbury, further away from London but a key Royalist recruitment centre throughout the war. When Essex learned of this, he marched on Worcester, where the first major encounter of the war took place at Powick Bridge on 23 September. A relatively minor Royalist victory, it established the reputation of Prince Rupert, whose cavalry gained a psychological edge over their Parliamentarian opponents.

The Royalist army now numbered around 15,000, although much of the infantry were armed with clubs or scythes; while better equipped, the forces of Parliament were half-trained, poorly disciplined, and their logistics inadequate. When Charles headed for London, Essex tried to block his route, and on 23 October, the two armies fought a bloody, chaotic, and indecisive battle at Edgehill. Essex continued retreating towards London; after an inconclusive encounter on 16 November at Turnham Green, west of London, operations ended for the winter. The Royalists withdrew to Oxford, which became their capital for the rest of the war. Elsewhere, Sir William Waller secured the south-east for Parliament; in December, Lord Wilmot captured Marlborough, opening communications between Oxford, and Royalist forces based at Launceston, in Cornwall.

1643

The events of 1642 showed the need to plan for a lengthy conflict. For the Royalists, this meant fortifying their new capital in Oxford, and connecting areas of support in England and Wales; Parliament focused on consolidating control of the areas they already held. Although peace talks were held, both parties continued to negotiate for Scots and Irish support; Charles sought to end the war in Ireland, allowing troops from the Royal Irish Army to be used to support the Royalists in England.

Fighting continued during the winter in Yorkshire, as Royalist leader Newcastle tried to secure a landing place for an arms shipment from the Dutch Republic. With insufficient troops to hold the entire area, his task was complicated by Parliamentarian forces under Lord Fairfax and his son Sir Thomas, which retained key towns like Hull and Leeds. The weapons convoy carrying Henrietta Maria finally managed to land at Bridlington in late February; on 4 June she left York escorted by 5,000 cavalry, arriving in Oxford in mid-July.

In the south-west, Royalist commander Sir Ralph Hopton secured Cornwall with victory at Braddock Down in January. In June, he advanced into Wiltshire, inflicting a serious defeat on Waller's 'Army of the Southern Association' at Roundway Down on 13 July. Arguably the most comprehensive Royalist victory of the war, it isolated Parliament's garrisons in the west and Prince Rupert stormed Bristol on 26 July. This gave the Royalists control of the second largest city in Britain and landing point for reinforcements from Ireland.

By late August, the Parliamentarian cause was close to collapse but was saved by Pym's leadership and determination, which resulted in important reforms. Both sides struggled to properly supply troops fighting outside their home regions and Parliament agreed steps to mitigate the problem. Seeing an opportunity to force Parliamentary moderates into a negotiated peace, in September the Royalists agreed a new three-part offensive. After taking Gloucester, Prince Rupert would advance on London, while Newcastle would tie down the Eastern Association army by advancing into East Anglia and Lincolnshire. Finally, Hopton would march into Hampshire and Sussex, threatening London from the south, and closing the iron foundries that were Parliament's main source of armaments.

However, Essex forced Prince Rupert to retreat from Gloucester, then checked his advance on London at Newbury on 20 September. Although Hopton reached Winchester, Waller prevented him making further progress; in October, Newcastle abandoned the second siege of Hull, while victory at Winceby secured eastern England for Parliament. Royalist failure ended any chance of concluding the war in the near future, leading both sides to step up the search for allies.

In September, the Royalists in Ireland agreed a truce with the Catholic Confederation, allowing Ormond to transfer troops to England but cost Charles the support of many Irish Protestants, especially in Munster. At the same time, details emerged of the "Antrim scheme", an alleged plan to use 20,000 Irish troops to recapture Southern Scotland for Charles; although highly impractical, the Covenanter government ended negotiations with the Royalists. Shortly thereafter, they signed the Solemn League and Covenant, agreeing to provide Parliament military backing in return for subsidies, and discussions on creating a single, Presbyterian church.

1644

The Solemn League created a Committee of Both Kingdoms to co-ordinate strategy in all three war zones, England, Scotland and Ireland, although Pym's death in December 1643 deprived Parliament of their most important leader. The Scots under Leven were ordered to take Newcastle, securing coal supplies for London, and closing the major import point for Royalist war supplies. He besieged the town in early February, but made little progress, observed by the Earl of Newcastle from his base in Durham.

On 29 March, Waller ended the offensive in Southern England by defeating Hopton at Cheriton, then joined Essex to threaten Oxford. Two weeks later, the Earl of Manchester defeated a Royalist force at Selby, forcing Newcastle to leave Durham and garrison York. The city was besieged by the Scots, Sir Thomas Fairfax, and Manchester's Army of the Eastern Association.

In May, Prince Rupert left Shrewsbury, and marched north, capturing Liverpool and Bolton en route. To avoid being shut up in Oxford, a field army nominally commanded by Charles retreated to Worcester; Essex ordered Waller to remain there, while he went west to relieve the siege of Lyme Regis. On 29 June, Waller clashed with Charles at Cropredy Bridge; although losses were minimal, his men were demoralised, and the army disintegrated, allowing Charles to pursue Essex into the West Country.

On the same day, Prince Rupert arrived at Knaresborough, 30 kilometres from York, to find himself facing a superior force. In the largest battle of the war on 2 July, the two armies met at Marston Moor, a decisive Royalist defeat that lost them the North. York surrendered on 16 July, and the Earl of Newcastle went into exile.

Essex forced the Royalists to abandon Lyme Regis, then continued into Cornwall, ignoring orders to return to London. In September, his army was trapped at Lostwithiel; 5,000 infantry were forced to surrender, although Essex and the cavalry escaped. At Second Newbury on 27 October, the Royalists lifted the siege of Donnington Castle, and Charles re-entered Oxford.

In military terms, by the end of 1644 the Royalists had recovered from the disaster at Marston Moor; of greater concern was their ability to finance the war. Unlike Parliament, which could levy taxes on imports and exports through London and other commercial centres, the Royalists simply took supplies from the areas they controlled. This led to the creation of Clubmen, or local self-defence associations; they opposed confiscations by either party, but were a bigger issue in Royalist areas like Cornwall and Hertfordshire.

The deaths of John Pym and John Hampden in 1643 removed a unifying force within Parliament, and deepened divisions. Supported by the Scots, the 'Peace Party' were concerned by political radicals like the Levellers, and wanted an immediate, negotiated settlement. The 'War Party' fundamentally mistrusted Charles, and saw military victory as the only way to secure their objectives. Many were religious Independents who opposed any state church, and strongly objected to Scottish demands for a unified, Presbyterian church of England and Scotland; Oliver Cromwell claimed he would fight, rather than accept such an outcome.

Failure to exploit Marston Moor, Essex' capitulation at Lostwithiel, and Manchester's alleged unwillingness to fight at Newbury led to claims some senior commanders were not committed to victory. Accusations against Manchester and Essex in particular were not confined to Cromwell, but shared by some Presbyterians, including Waller. In December, Sir Henry Vane introduced the Self-denying Ordinance, requiring any military officers who also sat in Parliament to resign one office or the other. Manchester and Essex were automatically removed, since they could not resign their titles, although they could be re-appointed, 'if Parliament approved.'

It also led to the creation of the New Model Army, a centralised, professional force, able and willing to operate wherever needed. Many of its recruits had served with Cromwell in the Eastern Association, or shared his views, and opponents viewed the New Model with suspicion from the outset. To offset this, they appointed the moderates Fairfax and Philip Skippon as Commander-in-Chief and head of the infantry respectively, as well as retaining some regional forces. These included the Northern and Western Associations, plus those serving in Cheshire and South Wales, all commanded by supporters of the Presbyterian faction in Parliament. Although he remained an MP, Cromwell was given command of the cavalry, under a 'temporary' three-month commission, constantly renewed.

1645

In January, representatives of both sides met at Uxbridge to discuss peace terms, but talks ended without agreement in February. Failure strengthened the pro-war parties, since it was clear Charles would never make concessions voluntarily, while divisions among their opponents encouraged the Royalists to continue fighting. In early 1645, the Royalists still controlled most of the West Country, Wales, and counties along the English border, despite losing their key supply base at Shrewsbury in February. Lord Goring's Western Army made another attempt on Portsmouth and Farnham; although he was forced to retreat, it showed Parliament could not assume this area was secure, while Montrose's Highland Campaign opened another front in the war.

On 31 May, Prince Rupert stormed Leicester; in response, Fairfax and the New Model Army abandoned their blockade of Oxford, and on 14 June, won a decisive victory at Naseby. Defeat cost the Royalists their most formidable field army, along with their artillery train, stores, and Charles' personal baggage. This included his private correspondence, detailing efforts to gain support from the Irish Catholic Confederation, the Papacy and France. Published by Parliament in a pamphlet entitled The King's Cabinet Opened, it seriously damaged his reputation.

After Naseby, Royalist strategy was to preserve their positions in Western England and Wales, while their cavalry went north to link up with Montrose in Scotland. Charles also hoped the Irish Catholic Confederation would supply him with an army of 10,000, that would land in Bristol and combine with Lord Goring to smash the New Model. Such hopes were illusory, and the only result was to deepen divisions among the Royalist leadership, many of whom viewed the proposed use of Catholic Irish troops in England with as much horror as their Parliamentarian opponents. Concerned by the wider implications of Royalist defeat and urged on by Henrietta Maria, French chief minister Cardinal Mazarin looked for ways to restore Charles with minimal French intervention. Talks were held between his representative, Jean de Montereul, and Lord Lothian, a senior Covenanter who was deeply suspicious of Cromwell and the Independents, but these discussions ultimately went nowhere.

Prince Rupert was sent to supervise the defence of Bristol and the West, while Charles made his way to Raglan Castle, then headed for the Scottish border. He reached as far north as Doncaster in Yorkshire, before retreating to Oxford in the face of superior Parliamentarian forces. In July, Fairfax lifted the siege of Taunton; a few days later at Langport, he destroyed Lord Goring's Western Army, the last significant Royalist field force. At the end of August, Charles left Oxford to relieve Hereford, which was besieged by the Covenanter army; as he approached, Leven was ordered to return to Scotland, following Montrose's victory at Kilsyth. The king moved onto Chester, where he learned Prince Rupert had surrendered Bristol on 10 September. Shocked by the loss, Charles dismissed his nephew.

While one detachment from the New Model under Colonel Rainsborough secured Berkeley Castle, another under Cromwell captured Royalist strongholds at Basing House and Winchester. Having secured his rear, Fairfax began reducing remaining positions in the west; by now, Clubmen militia in Hampshire and Dorset were as big an issue as the Royalist army. When his remaining cavalry were scattered at Rowton Heath on 24 September, Charles abandoned attempts to reach Scotland and returned to Newark. On 13 October, he learned of Montrose's defeat at Philiphaugh a month earlier, ending plans for taking the war into Scotland. The loss of Carmarthen and Chepstow in South Wales cut connections with Royalist supporters in Ireland (see Map) and Charles made his way back to Oxford, where he spent the winter besieged by the New Model.

1646

Following the fall of Hereford in December 1645, the Royalists held only Devon, Cornwall, North Wales, and isolated garrisons in Exeter, Oxford, Newark, and Scarborough Castle. Chester surrendered in February, after which the Northern Association Army joined the Covenanters besieging Newark. Hopton replaced Lord Goring as commander of the Western Army, and attempted to relieve Exeter. Defeated by the New Model at Torrington on 16 February, he surrendered at Truro on 12 March.

The last pitched battle of the war took place at Stow-on-the-Wold on 21 March, when 3,000 Royalists were dispersed by Parliamentary forces. With the end of the war in sight, Parliament issued a proclamation, allowing favourable terms for any Royalists who 'compounded' prior to 1 May. Those whose estates had been confiscated could regain them on payment of a fine, which was calculated on the value of their lands, and level of support; many took advantage of this.

After capturing Exeter and Barnstaple in April, the New Model marched on Oxford; on 27 April, Charles left the city in disguise, accompanied by two others. Parliament learned of his escape on the 29th, but for over a week had no idea where he was. On 6 May, they received a letter from David Leslie, the Scottish commander at Newark, announcing he had Charles in custody. Newark surrendered the same day, and the Scots went north to Newcastle, taking the king with them. This led to furious objections from Parliament, who approved a resolution ordering the Scots to leave England immediately. 

After lengthy negotiations, Oxford capitulated on 24 June; the garrison received passes to return home, and Prince Rupert and his brother, Prince Maurice, were ordered to leave England. Wallingford Castle surrendered on 27 July, then the remaining Royalist strongholds, although Harlech Castle in Wales held out until 13 March 1647.

Aftermath
In 1642, many Parliamentarians assumed military defeat would force Charles to agree to terms, which proved a fundamental misunderstanding of his character. When Prince Rupert told him in August 1645 that the war could no longer be won, Charles responded that while this may have been an accurate assessment of the military situation, 'God will not suffer rebels and traitors to prosper'. This deeply-held conviction meant he refused to agree to any substantial concessions, frustrating both allies and opponents.

Although Charles correctly assumed widespread support for the institution of monarchy made his position extremely strong, he failed to appreciate the impact of his constant prevarications, both before and during the war. He made peace with the Scots in 1639, then raised an army against them in 1640, while his actions prior to March 1642 convinced Parliament he would not keep his promises, and that any money they supplied to him would be employed against them. At various points in the period following Royalist defeat in 1646, he was negotiating separately with the Irish Confederation, the English Independents, the Covenanters, English Presbyterians, France, and the Papacy. 

The result was the creation of a powerful faction who believed Charles would never voluntarily agree to a suitable political settlement, and whose control of the New Model Army gave them the ability to impose one. Often grouped together as 'Independents', the reality was far more fluid; Sir Thomas Fairfax was a Presbyterian, who fought for Charles in 1639, and refused to participate in his execution, while even Cromwell initially viewed him with great respect. William Fiennes, 1st Viscount Saye and Sele, and his sons Nathaniel and John, are examples of those supported the Independents out of religious conviction, but wanted Charles to retain his throne.  

Charles continued to stall, to the increasing frustration of all parties, especially members of the New Model, many of whom had not been paid for over a year and wanted to go home. By March 1647, these arrears amounted to some £2.5 million, an enormous sum for the period, and moderates in Parliament led by Denzil Holles decided to remove the threat by sending the army to Ireland. Importantly, only those who agreed to go would receive their arrears, and when regimental representatives, or Agitators, demanded full payment for all in advance, Parliament disbanded the New Model, which refused to be dissolved. Although both Cromwell and Fairfax were disturbed by the radicalism displayed by parts of the army in the Putney Debates, they supported them against Parliament over the issue of pay. These tensions contributed to the outbreak of the Second English Civil War in 1648.

Notes

References

Sources

External links
 
 

 
English Civil War
Wars of the Three Kingdoms
17th century in England
17th century in Wales
17th century in Ireland
17th century in Scotland